The Hague Congress was the fifth congress of the International Workingmen's Association (IWA), held from 2–7 September 1872 in The Hague, the Netherlands.

The Hague Congress is famous for the expulsion of the anarchist Mikhail Bakunin for clashing with Karl Marx and his followers over the role of politics in the IWA had accepted proposals made by Marx. It marked the end of this organization as a unitarian alliance of all socialist factions (anarchists and Marxists).

History

Background

The background to the congress lay in the failure of the Paris Commune in June of the previous year, and in the different lessons drawn from it by the two most prominent members of the International, Karl Marx and Mikhail Bakunin. Marx, in his pamphlet The Civil War in France, believed that the major lesson from the Commune was that it was essential for the proletariat to take control of the State and thus the International had to become a true political party of the proletariat. On the other hand, Bakunin saw the most important element of the Commune as being what he saw as the Parisian workers' rejection of the State in all its forms and continued to call for a revolutionary alliance of workers and peasants in a decentralized organization.

In September 1871, the General Council of the International, headed by Marx, held a conference in London at which a series of resolutions were passed, including one (sometimes known as Resolution No.9) which stated: "That this constitution of the working class into a political party is indispensable in order to ensure the triumph of the social revolution and its ultimate end — the abolition of classes." This was seen by many to imply a major change of direction to the content of the International's General Rules.

The resolution caused a great deal of consternation in many sections of the International, particularly in Italy, French-speaking Switzerland and Spain, as it was seen as a measure which would eliminate the autonomy of local sections and turn the General Council into a centralized political office. The Conference itself was considered irregular by these sections, who believed that decisions of this nature could only have been decided at a regular congress of the International.

In June 1872, a Congress was convened for 2 September 1872 in The Hague, the agenda for which was to concern a general revision of the organization's General Rules.

During the conference

The Hague Congress met from 2 to 7 September 1872 in The Hague, the Netherlands. Marx declared that the proletariat had to take control of the state for a successful revolution, and advocated that the Congress vote to uphold this view. The anarchists naturally objected. Anarchist leaders Mikhail Bakunin and James Guillaume were expelled for protesting after the Congress accepted Marx's proposal. Bakunin was not present at the conference but was expelled in absentia.

Aftermath

After the expulsion of Bakunin and James Guillaume from the Hague Congress, the anarchists declared it null and void.

The anarchist faction (including the Jura federation, and the federations of Spain, Italy and Belgium) then held its own Congress of Saint-Imier, a few days later, from which also emerged the Anarchist St. Imier International.

Later in that year of 1872 Bakunin wrote:
The legitimacy of this conference has been contested. Mr. Marx, a very able political conniver, doubtless anxious to prove to the world that though he lacked firearms and cannons the masses could still be governed by lies, by libels, and by intrigues, organized his Congress of the Hague in September 1872. Barely two months have passed since this congress and already in all of Europe (with the exception of Germany where the workers are brainwashed by the lies of their leaders and their press) and its free federations – Belgian, Dutch, English, American, French, Spanish, Italian – without forgetting our excellent Jura Federation [Switzerland] – there has arisen a cry of indignation and contempt against this cynical burlesque which dares to call itself a true Congress of the International. Thanks to a rigged, fictitious majority, composed almost exclusively of members of the General Council, cleverly used by Mr. Marx, all has been travestied, falsified, brutalized. Justice, good sense, honesty, and the honor of the International brazenly rejected, its very existence endangered – all this the better to establish the dictatorship of Mr. Marx. It is not only criminal – it is sheer madness. Yet Mr. Marx who thinks of himself as the father of the International (he was unquestionably one of its founders) cares not a whit, and permits all this to be done! This is what personal vanity, the lust for power, and above all, political ambition can lead to. For all these deplorable acts Marx is personally responsible. Marx, in spite of all his mis-deeds, has unconsciously rendered a great service to the International by demonstrating in the most dramatic and evident manner that if anything can kill the International, it is the introduction of politics into its program.

And:
Is it not astonishing that Mr. Marx has believed it possible to graft onto this precise declaration, which he himself probably wrote, his scientific socialism? For this – the organization and the rule of the new society by socialist savants – is the worst of all despotic governments!

Primary sources 
 The Hague Congress of the First International, September 2–7, 1872. Minutes and Documents. Moscow: Progress Publishers, 1976.
 The Hague Congress of the First International, September 2–7, 1872. Reports and Letters. Moscow: Progress Publishers, 1978.

See also 
History of anarchism
International Anarchist Congresses

References 

1872 conferences
History of anarchism
History of socialism
Political congresses
1872 in politics
Anarchism in the Netherlands
International Workingmen's Association
19th century in The Hague
ne:प्रथम इन्टरनेसनलको हेग महाधिवेशन